Speranza decorata, the decorated granite, is a species of geometrid moth in the family Geometridae. It is found in North America.

The MONA or Hodges number for Speranza decorata is 6306.

References

Further reading

 
 
 
 
 
 
 
 
 
 

Macariini
Moths described in 1896